Selas-e Olya (also Romanized as S̱elas̱-e ‘Olyā) is a village in Jarahi Rural District, in the Central District of Mahshahr County, Khuzestan Province, Iran. At the 2006 census, its population was 57, in 10 families.

References 

Populated places in Mahshahr County